Andrea Paola Bonilla (born 5 December 1986) is an Ecuadorian long-distance runner. In 2021, she represented Ecuador at the 2020 Summer Olympics in Tokyo, Japan. She competed in the women's marathon.

In 2019, she competed in the women's marathon at the Pan American Games held in Lima, Peru. In 2020, she competed in the women's half marathon at the 2020 World Athletics Half Marathon Championships held in Gdynia, Poland.

She competed in the women's marathon at the 2022 World Athletics Championships held in Eugene, Oregon, United States.

References

External links 
 

Living people
1986 births
Place of birth missing (living people)
Ecuadorian female long-distance runners
Ecuadorian female marathon runners
Athletes (track and field) at the 2019 Pan American Games
Pan American Games competitors for Ecuador
Athletes (track and field) at the 2020 Summer Olympics
Olympic athletes of Ecuador
21st-century Ecuadorian women